Wrong Turn 4: Bloody Beginnings is a 2011 American slasher film written and directed by Declan O'Brien. It is the fourth installment of the Wrong Turn film series and served as a prequel to the original Wrong Turn film. The film grossed $3.6 million in home sales.

The film was followed by Wrong Turn 5: Bloodlines (2012).

Plot

In 1974, at the Glenville Sanatorium in West Virginia, Three Finger, Saw Tooth, and One Eye, known as the Hillicker Brothers, escape from their cells and release the other patients. Together, they cause a riot and brutally massacre the orderlies and doctors.

Twenty-nine years later, in 2003, nine Weston University students – Kenia, Jenna, Vincent, Sara, Bridget, Kyle, Claire, Daniel, and Lauren – spend their winter break snowmobiling to their friend Porter's cabin in the mountains. However, they get lost in a snowstorm and are forced to take shelter in the Glenville Sanatorium for the night, where the Hillickers are living. Lauren remembers her brother's stories about the sanatorium and the cannibals, but her friends don't believe her. As the group goes to bed, Vincent continues to explore the asylum, where he finds Porter's corpse before Saw Tooth kills him with a metal spike. The next day, with the storm still in full effect, the teens remain trapped. Jenna comes across the Hillickers butchering Porter's body in the kitchen and runs back to warn the others. After Porter's severed head is thrown at the group, Claire is hanged from a balcony with barbed wire by the trio and decapitated. The group attempts to flee the building, but their snowmobiles' spark plug wires have been taken out. Lauren skis down the mountain to seek help while the others barricade themselves in the doctor's office.

Kyle, Daniel, and Sara go into the basement to get weapons, but Daniel gets abducted, tied to a table in the kitchen, and slowly butchered and eaten alive. The rest of the group chases the cannibals and locks them in a cell as Kyle stays behind to watch the brothers while the others search for the spark-plug wires. When Kyle falls asleep, the brothers escape their cell, and the girls accidentally stab Kyle to death after mistaking him for one of the Hillickers. The brothers appear and chase the girls through the building, forcing them to exit through a window, but Jenna is killed before she can escape. The remaining girls are ambushed by the cannibals who used the group's snowmobiles to chase them outside, where Kenia gets injured, and One Eye kills Bridget.

As the day dawns, Lauren has frozen to death not far from a highway. Kenia is still being chased by One Eye when Sara reappears and knocks the cannibal off the snowmobile, allowing the pair to steal it and escape. They drive into a razor-wire trap set up by the cannibals, which decapitates them. Three Finger picks up their heads and puts them in their tow truck before moving away from the sanatorium with his brothers.

Cast

 Jenny Pudavick as Kenia Perrin
 Tenika Davis as Sara Washington
 Kaitlyn Wong as Bridget Manalo
 Terra Vnesa as Jenna Rivers
 Victor Zinck Jr. as Kyle Pappas
 Dean Armstrong as Daniel Burlingame
 Ali Tataryn as Lauren Jones
 Samantha Kendrick as Claire Kendrick
 Sean Skene as Three Finger and Vincent Flynn
 Scott Johnson as Saw Tooth and Orderly
 Daniel Skene as One Eye
 Dave Harms as Porter
 Arne MacPherson as Dr. Brendan Ryan
 Kristen Harris as Dr. Ann Marie McQuaid
 Blane Cypurda as Young Three Finger
 Bryan Verot as Young Saw Tooth
 Tristan Carlucci as Young One Eye

Release
Wrong Turn 4: Bloody Beginnings was released to DVD and Blu-ray on October 25, 2011. To date the film earned $3.6 million.

Reception
Rotten Tomatoes, a review aggregator, reports that 20% of five surveyed critics gave the film a positive review; the average rating is 5.2/10. Steve Barton of Dread Central rated it 2.5/5 stars and called it "the Congo of slasher movies", an objectively bad film that is still enjoyable to watch. Anton Bitel of Little White Lies wrote that although the film delivers what fans want, the characters are interchangeable and the plot is derivative. William Bibbiani of CraveOnline rated it 7.5/10 and wrote, "Wrong Turn 4 is the kind of movie that knows exactly what it is and offers nothing less, and occasionally a little more." Charles Webb of Twitch Film wrote, "There's not much to recommend the latest entry in this franchise, which, like all long-running horror series has already reached its point of diminishing returns."

References

External links
 
 
 

2011 films
2011 direct-to-video films
2011 horror films
2010s slasher films
20th Century Fox direct-to-video films
American LGBT-related films
Incest in film
LGBT-related horror films
American splatter films
American slasher films
4
Constantin Film films
Summit Entertainment films
Films set in 1974
Films set in 2003
Films about cannibalism
Films shot in Manitoba
Films set in West Virginia
Direct-to-video horror films
Direct-to-video prequel films
Films set in universities and colleges
Films set in psychiatric hospitals
American skiing films
2011 LGBT-related films
2010s English-language films
Films directed by Declan O'Brien
2010s American films
American prequel films